Ragnies is a village of Wallonia and a district of the municipality of Thuin, located in the province of Hainaut, Belgium.

Ragnies is a member of the Les Plus Beaux Villages de Wallonie ("The Most Beautiful Villages of Wallonia") association.

References

External links

Former municipalities of Hainaut (province)
Thuin